List of hospitals in Utah (U.S. state).

See also

 Community Health Systems
 Hospital Corporation of America (parent company of MountainStar Healthcare)
 Intermountain Healthcare
 Steward Health Care System

References

External links

 Intermountain Healthcare (official website)
  List of hospitals in Utah
 Steward Health Care System (official website)
 MountainStar Healthcare (official website)
 Community Health Systems (official website)

Utah
 
Hospitals